Wendy Rosenberg Makkena  (born October 4, 1958) is an American actress best known for playing Sister Mary Robert in the film Sister Act (1992) and its sequel Sister Act 2: Back in the Habit (1993) and numerous other roles in film and television. She has appeared regularly on stage since the 1980s. Her other film credits include Air Bud (1997), State of Play (2009), and A Beautiful Day in the Neighborhood (2019).

Life and career
Makkena was born in Manhattan and attended the Juilliard School. Her mother, Diana K. Rosenberg, was an astrologer specializing in various fields therein including Western and Indian astrology. Makkena has been married to Bob Krakower, an acting coach, since 1997 and they have a child together. 

In 1987, she made her Broadway debut in the production of Pygmalion. She later appeared in Lend Me a Tenor and Side Man. In 1988, she made her film debut appearing in Eight Men Out.

In 1992, Makkena had a supporting role opposite Whoopi Goldberg in the musical comedy film Sister Act as the shy but talented singing nun Sister Mary Robert, a role she reprised in Sister Act 2: Back in the Habit the following year. In both films, singer Andrea Robinson provided the actual vocals. In 1994, she co-starred opposite Christopher Lloyd in the comedy film Camp Nowhere, and in 1997 appeared in Air Bud. In 1998, she played a leading role in the LGBT-related independent comedy-drama Finding North. On television, she starred in the short-lived CBS sitcom A League of Their Own in 1993 and later had recurring roles on NYPD Blue, Judging Amy and NCIS. She also had regular roles on the short-lived The Job (2001-02), Oliver Beene (2003-04), Listen Up! (2004-05) and The Mob Doctor (2012-13).

Filmography

Film

Television

References

External links
 
Wendy Makkena at the Internet Broadway Database

1958 births
20th-century American actresses
21st-century American actresses
Actresses from New York City
American film actresses
American stage actresses
American television actresses
Living people
People from Manhattan
Juilliard School alumni